General elections were held in Belgium on 12 June 1855. In the Senate elections, Catholics won 31 seats and the Liberal Party won 23. Voter turnout was the lowest in Belgian history at just 35.0%, although only 42,907 people were eligible to vote. The Chamber was not up for election this year.

Results

Senate

References

1850s elections in Belgium
General
Belgium